Daniello is both a masculine Italian given name and a surname. Notable people with the name include:

Given name
Daniello Bartoli (1608–1685), Italian Jesuit writer and historiographer
Daniello Concina (1687–1756), Italian Dominican preacher, controversialist and theologian
Daniello Marco Delfino (1653–1704), Italian cardinal
Daniello Porri (died 1566), Italian Renaissance painter
Daniello Solaro, Italian Baroque sculptor

Surname
Joe Daniello, American animation director
Ralph Daniello (1886–1925), American mobster

Italian masculine given names